The following is a list of episodes of Bert the Conqueror: an  American reality television series hosted by stand-up comedian Bert Kreischer, an "everyday guy" who travels across the United States to amusement parks and other entertainment venues to experience and promote various roller coasters, water rides, and unusual sports.

Series overview

Episodes

Season 1 (2010)
The first season was granted production for a ten episode run.  This season featured a guest appearance by Dolly Parton.

Season 2 (2011)
On September 24, 2010, Bert Kreischer received word that Bert the Conqueror was renewed for a second season.  The news was revealed on the Bert the Conqueror Facebook page the next day.  The second season began on April 3, 2011 with a two episode premiere featuring Maine and Virginia.  This season featured guest appearances by Man vs. Food host Adam Richman and Olympic gold medal swimmer Misty Hyman.

Season 3 (2016)
On May 9, 2016, it was announced the show would return for a third season, which premiered on June 7, 2016.

References 

Lists of American non-fiction television series episodes
Lists of reality television series episodes